Natchanon Jothavorn (born 24 January 1992) is a Thai professional footballer who plays as a goalkeeper for Thai League 2 club Nakhon Pathom United. He played for Thai Honda in Thai League 1 in 2017.

References

Footnotes

General references
 http://player.7mth.com/656916/index.shtml
 
 https://www.smmsport.com/reader/news/287195

External links
 

1992 births
Living people
Natchanon Jothavorn
Natchanon Jothavorn
Association football goalkeepers
Natchanon Jothavorn
Natchanon Jothavorn
Natchanon Jothavorn
Natchanon Jothavorn
Natchanon Jothavorn